Franco, ese hombre, translated into English as Franco, that man, is a 1964 documentary film by Spanish director José Luis Sáenz de Heredia. It follows the military and political career of the Spanish Head of State Francisco Franco until the 25th anniversary of the end of the Civil War. It uses diverse footage and interviews Franco's doctor in Morocco, Manuel Aznar Zubigaray, and Franco himself. It is a commemorative documentary of the 25th anniversary of Franco's victory in the Spanish Civil War.

See also 
 Caudillo

External links 

1964 films
Documentary films about politicians
1960s Spanish-language films
Documentary films about the Spanish Civil War
Films directed by José Luis Sáenz de Heredia
Spanish documentary films
1964 documentary films
Films about Francisco Franco
1960s Spanish films